The women's heavyweight is a competition featured at the 2019 World Taekwondo Championships, and was held at the Manchester Arena in Manchester, United Kingdom on 16 and 17 May. Heavyweights were limited to a minimum of 73 kilograms in body mass.

Medalists

Results
Legend
P — Won by punitive declaration

Final

Top half

Bottom half

References
Draw
Results

External links
Official website

Women's 74
World